Cassius Clay (soon Muhammad Ali) fought Sonny Banks in a ten-round boxing match at Madison Square Garden in New York City on February 10, 1962. Clay won the fight through a technical knockout when the referee stopped the fight in the fourth round. The event is remembered for being the first professional boxing match in which Ali was officially knocked down in the ring by his boxing opponent.

Notes

References

Banks
1962 in boxing
February 1962 sports events in the United States